Telescopus tessellatus, commonly known as the Soosan tiger snake or the Soosan viper, is a snake in the Colubridae family. It is found in western Iran and eastern Iraq. It occurs in rocky places, scrubland, montane areas, and rocky steppe. It is currently listed as of "least concern" on the IUCN Red List of Threatened Species.

References 

tessellatus
Snakes of Asia
Reptiles of Iran
Reptiles of Iraq
Taxa named by Frank Wall
Reptiles described in 1908